Daemilus mutuurai is a species of moth of the family Tortricidae. It is found in Japan, where it has been recorded from Honshu.

The wingspan is 14–16 mm.

References

Moths described in 1975
Archipini